Heliaeschna fuliginosa (black-banded duskhawker) is a species of dragonfly in the family Aeshnidae. It is found in Angola, Cameroon, Central African Republic, the Democratic Republic of the Congo, Ivory Coast, Equatorial Guinea, Gabon, Gambia, Ghana, Guinea, Liberia, Nigeria, Sierra Leone, and Uganda. Its natural habitat is subtropical or tropical moist lowland forests.

References

Aeshnidae
Insects described in 1893
Taxonomy articles created by Polbot